Stade Pierre-Fabre, formerly known as Stade Pierre-Antoine, is a multi-purpose stadium in Castres, France.  It is currently used mostly for rugby union matches and is the home stadium of Castres Olympique. The stadium is able to hold 12,300 spectators, one of the smallest in Top 14.

Overview
The stadium is currently named after Pierre Fabre, the late pharmaceutical magnate who owned Castres Olympique from 1988 until his death in 2013. The venue was renamed during ceremonies held in conjunction with Castres' Top 14 match against Montpellier on 9 September 2017.

References

External links
Rugbystadiums.co.uk page

Castres Olympique
Pierre-Fabre
Multi-purpose stadiums in France
Sports venues in Tarn (department)